Binko is a commune in the Cercle of Dioïla in the Koulikoro Region of south-western Mali. The main town (chef-lieu) is Tingolé.

References

Communes of Koulikoro Region